In model theory, a branch of mathematical logic, the Łoś–Vaught test is a criterion for a theory to be complete, unable to be augmented without becoming inconsistent. For theories in classical logic, this means that for every sentence, the theory contains either the sentence or its negation but not both.

Statement

A theory  with signature σ is -categorical for an infinite cardinal  if  has exactly one model (up to isomorphism) of cardinality 

See also

References

 .
 .
 .

Mathematical logic
Model theory
Theorems in the foundations of mathematics